The Federal Criminal Court, is a Swiss federal court. Since its inception in 2004, it has been located in Bellinzona.

Legal basis 

Article 191a para. 1 of the Swiss Constitution of 18 April 1999, (SC; SR [Classified Compilation of Federal Legislation] no. 101) states: The Confederation shall appoint a criminal court, which shall hear at first instance criminal cases that by law come under federal jurisdiction. The law may confer further powers on the Federal Criminal Court.

The Federal Act on the Organization of the Federal Criminal Authorities (SR no. 173.71) governs status, organization, jurisdiction and the applicable procedural law. 

Furthermore, its internal Organizational Regulations of 31 August 2010, (SR no. 173.713.161) provides for the rules applicable to the Federal Criminal Court's organization and administration.

Jurisdiction 
The Federal Criminal Court's Penal Chamber renders decisions on indictments for crimes that by law come under federal jurisdiction; primarily the felonies specified in articles 23 and 24 of the Criminal Procedure Code of 5 October 2007 (Criminal Procedure Code, CPC; SR no. 312.0). The Court's Penal Chamber moreover tries criminal offences for which jurisdiction is conferred upon the Court either by administrative criminal law or by other federal acts. 

The Federal Criminal Court's Appeals Chamber provides judicial review in unfolding federal criminal proceedings, in particular by adjudicating complaints against the rulings and procedural acts of the police, the Office of the Attorney General of Switzerland (the federal public prosecutor), the Court's Penal Chamber and the Compulsory Measures Court. Its jurisdiction encompasses other matters; paramount among those are, both in number of cases and in material significance, remedies concerning international assistance in criminal matters (including cases of extradition).

Organisation and size 
Pursuant to articles 32 et sqq. of the Federal Act on the Organization of the Federal Criminal Authorities, the Federal Criminal Court comprises the two above-mentioned chambers (each with a presiding judge) and the General Secretariat with its administrative and technical services. The Court manifests and administrates itself by dint of the following executive bodies: the Office of the Chief Justice, the Court's Plenary Assembly and the Administrative Commission.

As of January 2013, the Federal Criminal Court is constituted with a staff of about 65 people, 18 of which are judges.

See also 
 Crime in Switzerland

Notes and references

External links
 

Criminal Court
Bellinzona
Buildings and structures in Ticino
Neoclassical architecture in Switzerland
2004 establishments in Switzerland
Courts and tribunals established in 2004